A Little Crane is a 1968 Soviet drama film directed by Nikolay Moskalenko.

Plot 
The film takes place after the war. Surviving soldiers return to their native village. Among them was not Martha's husband, whom she had been waiting for all these years, but nevertheless she remained faithful to him.

Cast 
 Lyudmila Chursina as Marfa
 Nonna Mordyukova as Glafira
 Tatyana Pelttser as Nastasya
 Rimma Markova as Avdotya
 Armen Dzhigarkhanyan as Styshnoy
 Nikolai Gritsenko as Markelov
 Georgi Zhzhyonov as Father Leonid
 Evgeniy Shutov as Zulya
 Aleksei Karpushkin as Seryozha (as Alyosha Karpushkin)

References

External links 
 

1968 films
1960s Russian-language films
Soviet drama films
1968 drama films
Mosfilm films